Zbigniew Leśniak (born 12 March 1950 in Nowy Sącz) is a former Polish slalom canoeist who competed in the 1970s. He won two bronze medals in the C-2 team event at the ICF Canoe Slalom World Championships, earning them in 1975 and 1977. He also finished 17th in the C-2 event at the 1972 Summer Olympics in Munich.

References
Sports-reference.com profile

1950 births
Canoeists at the 1972 Summer Olympics
Living people
Olympic canoeists of Poland
Polish male canoeists
Sportspeople from Nowy Sącz
Medalists at the ICF Canoe Slalom World Championships